Ginka Gyurova (born 15 April 1954) is a Bulgarian rower who competed in the 1976 Summer Olympics and in the 1980 Summer Olympics.

In 1976 she was a crew member of the Bulgarian boat which won the silver medal in the coxed fours event. Four years later she won her second silver medal with the Bulgarian boat in the 1980 coxed fours competition.

External links
 

1954 births
Living people
Bulgarian female rowers
Olympic rowers of Bulgaria
Rowers at the 1976 Summer Olympics
Rowers at the 1980 Summer Olympics
Olympic silver medalists for Bulgaria
Olympic medalists in rowing
Medalists at the 1980 Summer Olympics
Medalists at the 1976 Summer Olympics
World Rowing Championships medalists for Bulgaria